SS Noordam (1902) was a 12,531-ton passenger liner of the Holland America Line, sailing mostly between Rotterdam and New York. She was built by Harland and Wolff. In April 1912 she alerted  to ice early into its ill-fated maiden voyage. She operated during part of World War I, but hit mines on two occasions and was laid up until the war ended. In 1923 she was chartered by Swedish American Line and operated as SS Kungsholm until 1926 when she reverted to Holland America as Noordam. She was scrapped in 1927.

References

External links

Ocean liners
Ships built in Belfast
Ships of the Holland America Line
Ships built by Harland and Wolff
1902 ships
Ships of Swedish American Line